This is a list of squares in Copenhagen, Denmark.

Terminology

In Danish, a square is typically called a Plads (Højbro Plads, Israels Plads etc.) or a Torv (or -torv, Christianshavns Torv, Nytorv). The Danish use the word "plads" where an English-speaker would generally use the word "square." This follows the pattern established in other European languages: the German use the cognate "platz" (Berlin's Potsdamer Platz); the French "place" (Paris' Place de Vosque); the Spanish "plaza" (like Madrid's Plaza Mayor); and the Italian "piazza" (Rome's Piazza Navona). The word "torv" literally means "market" and in toponyms often commemorates a market that used to take place at the site: Amagertorv was the place where the Amager farmers used to sell their produce and Kultorvet (literally "The Coal Market") was Copenhagen's main coal market. However, this is not always the case: Søtorvet was never a market place, nor was Sølvtorvet ever a hub for trade in silver. The word "byrum" (literally "urban room") has a somewhat broader meaning then "plads" or "torv", roughly similar to "urban space" (or public space"), but is purely a generic term which is not used in toponyms.

Inner Copenhagen

City centre

Amager

Brønshøj-Husum

Frederiksberg

Nordvest

Nørrebro

Østerbro

Valby

Vesterbro/Kongens Enghave

Suburbs

Gentofte Municipality

Lyngby-Taarbæk Municipality

See also
 List of parks and open spaces in Copenhagen

References

External links

 
Copenhagen-related lists